The following is a list of notable events and releases of the year 2019 in Norwegian music.

Events

January 
 10 – The 18th All Ears festival started in Oslo (January 10 – 12).
 19 – The Oslo Operaball was arranged in Oslo (February 19 – 20).
 24 –  The 38th annual Djangofestival started on Cosmopolite in Oslo, Norway (January 24–26).
 25 –  The 32nd Nordlysfestivalen started in Tromsø (January 25 – February 3).
 29 –  The Barokkfest started in Trondheim (January 29 – February 3).
 31
 The 8th Bodø Jazz Open Vinterjazz started in Bodø, Norway (January 31 – February 2).
 The 21st Polarjazz Festival started in Longyearbyen, Svalbard (January 31 – February 3).

February 
 14 – The 14th Ice Music Festival starts in Geilo, Norway (February 14–16).
 20 – The Hemsingfestivalen starts in Aurdal (February 20 – 24).
 28 – The By:Larm Festival started in Oslo (February 28 – March 2).

March 
 6 – The Borealis Festival starts in Bergen (March 6 – 10).
 17 – The 62nd Narvik Winter Festival starts in Narvik (March 17 – 26).

April 
 12 – The 46th Vossajazz starts in Voss, Norway (April 12 – 14).
 18 – The Inferno Metal Festival starts in Oslo (April 18–21).
 24 –  The Nidaros Bluesfestival starts in Trondheim (April 24 – 28).

May 
 3 – The Balejazz starts in Balestrand (May 3 – 5).
 6 – The 30th MaiJazz starts in Stavanger, Norway (May 6 – 12).
 8 – The 15th AnJazz, the Hamar Jazz Festival starts at Hamar, Norway (May 8 – 12).
 22 – The Festspillene i Bergen starts in Bergen (May 22 – June 5).
 24 – The 47th Nattjazz starts in Bergen, Norway (May 24 – June 1).

June 
 1 – The National Music Day is arranged in Oslo.
 5 – The Hardanger Musikkfest starts in Hardanger (June 5 – 10).
 12 – The Bergenfest starts in Bergen (June 12 – 15).
 13 – The Norwegian Wood music festival starts in Oslo (June 13 – 15).
 14 – The Kråkeslottfestivalen starts in Bøvær, Senja (June 14 – 16).
 25 – The Risør kammermusikkfest starts in Risør (June 25 – 30).
 25 – The Hove Festival starts in Tromøy (June 28 – 29).

July 
 3 – The Kongsberg Jazzfestival opens at Kongsberg consert (August 3 – 6).
 4 – The 23rd Skånevik Bluesfestival starts in Skånevik, Norway (July 4 – 6).
 11 – The 18th Stavernfestivalen starts in Stavern (August 11 – 13).
 15 – The Moldejazz starts in Molde (August 15 – 20).
 18 – The Bukta Tromsø Open Air Festival starts in Tromsø (August 18 – 20).
 24 – The 24th Canal Street Festival starts in Arendal (July 24 – 27).

August 
 6 – The 20th Øyafestivalen starts in Oslo, Norway (August 6 – 10).
 8 – The 33rd Sildajazz starts in Haugesund, Norway (August 8 – 9).
 11 – The 34th Oslo Jazzfestival starts in Oslo, Norway (August 11 – 17).

September 
 5 – The 14th Punktfestivalen opens in Kristiansand (September 5–7).

October 
 17 – The 37th DølaJazz starts in Lillehammer (October 17 – 20).

November

December

Albums released

January

February

March

April

May

See also 
 2019 in Norway
 Music of Norway
 Norway in the Eurovision Song Contest 2019
 Spellemannprisen
 Buddyprisen
 Nordlysprisen
 Edvard Grieg Memorial Award
 Thorgeir Stubø Memorial Award
 Rolf Gammleng Memorial Award
 Radka Toneff Memorial Award

References

 
Norwegian music
Norwegian
Music
2010s in Norwegian music